Giovanni Maria Emilio Castellani O.F.M. (13 April 1888 – 30 August 1953) was an Italian prelate of the Catholic Church, who became an archbishop in 1929 and led jurisdictions in Greece and Ethiopia. He worked in the diplomatic service of the Holy See from 1945 to 1953.

Biography
Giovanni Castellani was born in Civitella, in the Diocese of Todi, Italy, on 13 April 1888. He was ordained a priest of the Franciscans on 4 September 1910.

On 5 January 1929, Pope Pius XI appointed him Archbishop of Rhodes, Greece. He received his episcopal consecration on 2 April 1929 from Cardinal Bonaventura Cerretti in the Basilica of Saint Mary of the Angels in Assisi.

On 25 March 1937, Pope Pius named him titular archbishop of Perge, Apostolic Delegate to Italian East Africa, and Vicar Apostolic of Addis Abeda, Ethiopia.

On 18 December 1945, Pope Pius XII named him Apostolic Nuncio to both El Salvador and Guatemala. He took up a position in the offices of the Secretariat of State in Rome on 23 August 1951.

He died in Rome on 30 August 1953.

Notes

References

External links
Catholic Hierarchy: Archbishop Giovanni Maria Emilio Castellani 

1888 births
1953 deaths
People from the Province of Perugia
Franciscan bishops
Apostolic Nuncios to Guatemala
Apostolic Nuncios to El Salvador